Giordano Pantano (born 26 May 1992 in Italy) is an Italian footballer.

References

Association football defenders
Living people
Italian footballers
1992 births
Aurora Pro Patria 1919 players
A.S.D. Sorrento players
S.S.D. Lucchese 1905 players
F.C. Lumezzane V.G.Z. A.S.D. players
Selfoss men's football players